A Knight in York is a live album by the group Blackmore's Night, released in 2012. The album recorded in autumn of 2011 at the Opera House in York, England. It entered at #2 on the New Age Billboard Charts. It entered at #2 on the German DVD Charts, and entered at 8# on the German album charts. The album also reached #46 in Austria and #85 in Switzerland. It mostly consists of songs from their two albums, Secret Voyage and Autumn Sky.

Track listing
 "Locked Within the Crystal Ball" – 8:47
 "Gilded Cage" - 4:18
 "The Circle" - 7:17 
 "Journeyman" - 6:58 (Nordman cover)
 "World of Stone" - 6:14 
 "The Peasant's Promise" - 5:11 
 "Toast to Tomorrow" - 4:48
 "Fires at Midnight" - 9:44 
 "Barbara Allen" - 5:27 
 "Darkness" - 3:30
 "Dance of the Darkness" - 3:47
 "Dandelion Wine" - 6:07
 "All the Fun of the Fayre" - 4:07
 "First of May" - 3:35 (Bee Gees cover)

Personnel
 Ritchie Blackmore - guitars, mandolin, hurdy-gurdy
 Candice Night - lead vocals, shawms, assorted woodwinds, tambourine
 Squire Malcolm of Lumley (Malcolm Dick) - drums, percussion
 Bard David of Larchmont - keyboards, background vocals
 Gypsy Rose (Elizabath Cary) - violins, background vocals
 Earl Grey of Chimay (Mike Clemente) - bass, rhythm guitar
 Minstrel Albert - shawms, bagpipes
 Autumn - special guest

Charts

Notes

External links
 Lyrics at Blackmore's Night official site

Blackmore's Night albums
2012 live albums
Albums produced by Ritchie Blackmore